Michael Davis is a Los Angeles-based artist, working in the fields of drawings, sculptures, installation art and public art. He maintains a studio in San Pedro, California. He received a Masters in Fine Art from California State University, Fullerton, and he is a grant recipient from the National Endowment for the Arts, among others. His work is in museums, galleries across the United States. His significant body of public art is found in rail stations, public parks and civic buildings across the United States and in Japan. He is the co-author and subject of PROGRESS: In Search of the American Esthetic, an exhibition that features photographs, video projections, audio and ephemera documenting artists Michael Davis and Stephen Moore’s cross-country trip by car from California to New York in 1970 and their subsequent trip traveling the same route in reversing, from New York to California.

Influences 
An early influence was Downey High School art teacher Ray White. White was a graduate of Chouinard Art Institute, the influential school that served as an incubator for early Los Angeles contemporary artists. White introduced Davis to the work of Italian abstract expressionist Rico Lebrun, as well as the German Bauhaus School of Art, that combined crafts and fine arts.

American installation artist Robert Irwin influenced Davis in the relationship of separation of public and private space. Irwin's public art maintains a focus in creating subtle, at times vanishing environments with plain materials.

Growing up in the midst of cold war America, Davis was highly influenced by the ever-present threat of communism and imminent nuclear war.

Criticism and commentary
Davis was included in a compilation of Los Angeles Artists, L.A.Rising, SoCal Artists Before 1980. The compilation by Lynn Kienholz, documented the work of 500 important artists working in Los Angeles during the growth of the seminal art scene. In that book Walter Hopps wrote: "Davis's works have a strong iconographic content...not only is there an interest in architectural form, but also a kind of mythology...It's crafted and put together like something on the fringes of urban society.".

Christopher Miles said of Davis: "Davis’ practice is clearly informed by a long personal history on the part of the artist with direct engagement in the discourses of conceptual art practice, situational aesthetics, semiotics, deconstruction, and the critique of representation…. Though in ways elegaic, but not sentimental or nostalgic, Davis’ work aspires to be art of his epoch, and perhaps even for his epoch–an art that engages with shared experience and endeavor, shared excitement and shared angst."

Howard N. Fox in the catalog essay, “Road Trip/Road Show” wrote: “Michael Davis’ and Stephen Moore’s “Progress, In Search of the American Esthetic”, a trek across the country from Los Angeles to New York twice – once in 1970 and again in 2005 – is a richly provocative contemporary example of the archetypal pop-culture road trip…Every nuance of bittersweet irony, of humor, or poignancy in “Progress” plays against the American citizenry’s’ received culture of respect, reverence, even awe for the nation’s natural beauty and bounty, including a long tradition in visual art and literature of celebrating the land.”

Helen Lessick of Public Art Review Magazine said "Coming of age during the minimal art movement Michael Davis was interested in using non-traditional art sites to create open public theater. He wanted to change the viewer’s passive observation of art into an active interplay outside the commercial gallery system."

References

Notes
L.A. Rising, SoCal Artists Before 1980, 
Walter Hopps, 6 L.A. Sculptors, An Interview with Walter Hopps by Anne Goley
Miles, Christopher (2014). "Christopher Miles, "No Place to Hide" catalog". El Camino College Art Gallery.

Links
http://www.nytimes.com/2007/12/16/arts/design/16kino.html

Living people
Artists from Los Angeles
1948 births
People from San Pedro, Los Angeles